Events in the year 1947 in Indonesia. The country had an estimated population of   71,460,600 people.

Incumbents
 President: Sukarno
 Vice President: Mohammad Hatta 
 Prime Minister: Sutan Sjahrir  (until 3 July), Amir Sjarifuddin (from 3 July)
 Chief Justice: Kusumah Atmaja

Events
 Continuing Indonesian National Revolution
 February - Establishment of Sarbupri
 8 March - Establishment of the Communist Party of Indonesia (Red)
 7 June - Establishment of the Toraja Mamasa Church
 June - Disestablishment of the Third Sjahrir Cabinet
 3 July - Establishment of the First Amir Sjarifuddin Cabinet
 21 July to 4 August - Operation Product
 29 July - Shoot down of Dakota VT-CLA
 1 August - United Nations Security Council Resolution 27
 25 August - United Nations Security Council Resolution 30
 25 August - United Nations Security Council Resolution 31
 26 August - United Nations Security Council Resolution 32
 3 October - United Nations Security Council Resolution 35
 1 November - United Nations Security Council Resolution 36
 11 November - Disestablishment of the First Amir Sjarifuddin Cabinet
 12 November - Establishment of the Second Amir Sjarifuddin Cabinet
 November - Establishment of the Sentral Organisasi Buruh Seluruh Indonesia
 9 December - Rawagede massacre

Births
 23 January – Megawati Sukarnoputri, politician, President of Indonesia

References

 
1940s in Indonesia
Years of the 20th century in Indonesia